Lordsburg—Hidalgo County, Lordsburg, Hidalgo County, or Lordsburg Hidalgo County may refer to:
 Lordsburg, New Mexico, the county seat of Hidalgo County, New Mexico, US
 Lordsburg-Hidalgo County Library
 Lordsburg Hidalgo County Museum

See also

 Lordsburg (disambiguation)
 Hidalgo County (disambiguation)
 Hidalgo (disambiguation)